Puska  is a village in Croatia. 

Populated places in Sisak-Moslavina County